The Supersizers Go... and The Supersizers Eat... are BBC television series about the history of food, mainly in Britain. Both are presented by journalist and restaurant critic Giles Coren and broadcaster and comedian Sue Perkins.

The series originated in a one-off edition in April 2007 as part of a season of programmes on the Edwardian period, "Edwardian Supersize Me", a reference to the film  Super Size Me by Morgan Spurlock. This programme set the format for the subsequent television series in that Coren and Perkins adopted the persona of a couple living in the Edwardian period and for a week ate the food which people from that period would have eaten. In addition they would take part in the interests and activities of them too, even going so far as adopting the dress and mannerisms of the time, with plenty of sarcastic humor. Before and after the experience they were subject to medical tests to see how the diet affected them.

As of 2 August 2010 the series was being broadcast on the UKTV channel Good Food.  The episodes shown on Good Food were cut to 47-minute versions of the original, to accommodate commercial breaks. The series also broadcasts on Yesterday and Watch.

In 2011 a one-off royal wedding-themed special was broadcast in the same week as Prince William's marriage to Catherine Middleton.

As of January 2012 the show was in the United States on The Cooking Channel, shown with commercial interruptions. It was also on the Food Network in Canada.

Episodes
The one-off programme "Edwardian Supersize Me" was produced as part of the season "The Edwardians – the Birth of Now" on BBC Four.

The Supersizers Go...

A series of six episodes was commissioned by the BBC under the title The Supersizers Go... which was broadcast from May 2008 and covered different periods.

The Supersizers Eat...

The Supersizers Eat sees Coren and Perkins sample the culinary delights of 1950s Britain, Medieval England, 1980s London and the Roaring Twenties. Marie-Antoinette's Versailles and Ancient Rome also feature, making this the first time that an entire episode was devoted to historical foreign cuisine.

Coren has said that he and Perkins are reluctant to make a third series ("Sue and I can't just keep sitting at tables, pulling faces and making smart remarks about the food") but that the duo are likely to do further work with each other on the BBC.

Special

Foreign versions
So far, the only foreign version of Supersizers is the widely popular Swedish TV show Historieätarna ("The History Eaters"), shown on SVT. Unlike the British show, the show had a third season, following Lotta Lundgren and Erik Haag as they live and eat in Swedish time periods from the 16th century to the 21st. The show also generated a 24-episode Christmas special (or Advent calendar) for children in 2015 called Tusen år till julafton (sv) ("A thousand years to Christmas Eve"). Due to legal conflict with Fremantle media and later Sony about who owns the legal rights to the series, the Christmas special will not be aired again.

References

External links
 Edwardian Supersize Me @ BBC Programmes
 The Supersizers Go... @ BBC Programmes
 The Supersizers Eat... @ BBC Programmes
 Giles and Sue's Royal Wedding @ BBC Programmes
 
 

BBC Television shows
2008 British television series debuts
2009 British television series endings
English-language television shows
Historical reality television series
BBC television documentaries about history during the 20th Century
BBC television documentaries about history during the 18th and 19th centuries
BBC television documentaries about history during the 16th and 17th centuries
BBC television documentaries about medieval history
BBC television documentaries about prehistoric and ancient history